The Morgan Beatus (New York, Morgan Library & Museum, MS 644) is an illuminated manuscript with miniatures by the artist Magius of the Commentary on the Book of the Apocalypse by the eighth-century Spanish monk Beatus, which described the end of days and the Last Judgment.  Having been created at some time in the 10th century, the Morgan Beatus is one of the oldest examples of a revived Spanish apocalypse tradition. According to the style it was created by Mozarabs (Christians in Muslim-Spanish land).  The Apocalypse and the commentary on this scripture by Saint Beatus of Liébana became one of the most important religious texts of the Middle Ages, and was often illustrated very fully.

Contents
The Morgan Beatus contains preliminary material with brilliantly painted Evangelist portraits (ff. 1–9), Beatus's Commentary on the Apocalypse, (ff. 10-233), excerpts from Isidore of Seville's De ad finitatibus et gradibus and of his Etymologies (ff. 234r-237r), St. Jerome's Commentary on Daniel, (ff. 239–293), and a third exposition of the Apocalypse (ff. 294–299). This last is a synopsis of a variety of sources and, apparently, a later addition. Its current dimensions are 387mm x 285mm (15 3/32 x 11 1/8 inches). Early folios indicate the removal of the original gold and redrawing of letters by Magius, the creator of the manuscript, and his assistants.

The 300 leaves of the manuscript are of fine-quality parchment, thick and uniform in color. Margins are wide, script and illuminations, generally well preserved. Several folios are damaged by dampness or fire. The colors are remarkably well preserved and vibrant. Magius is identified as the work's maker by means of a colophon on f. 293 and a memento on f. 233. The colophon also provides a cryptic date and references to the commissioning abbot and the monastery of St Michael.

The collation of the original quires is difficult to determine due to the loss of some leaves. In the course of combining bifolios into quires, the medieval bookmakers needed a system by which they could keep the various quires in their proper order. Catchwords eventually became the standard tool for this purpose. The Morgan Beatus, however, does not utilize this technique. Instead, this manuscript makes use of signatures consisting of Roman numerals followed by the letter "Q" There are two miniature bearing folios signed in this fashion. Intact quires consist of eight leaves (four bifolios). Most signatures are in the corner of the lower margin of the final verso. The fact that these signatures are Roman numerals, and not Arabic, suggests against the bookmakers being local or Mozarab vocations to the monastery scriptorium. At the same time it is seen as evidence dating the manuscript to the first half of the tenth century. The opening folios (ff. 1–9) seem to be a later addition, not only because they lack these signatures, but because they are composed of two sets of three bifolios.

Gallery

Footnotes

References

Forbes, Andrew ; Henley, David (2012). Apocalypse: The Illustrated Book of Revelation. Chiang Mai: Cognoscenti Books. ASIN: B008WAK9SS
Walther, Ingo F. & Wolf, Norbert (2005) Codices Illustres: the world's most famous illuminated manuscripts, 400 to 1600. Köln, Taschen

External links

Paper on the manuscript 
Image of Last Judgment (fols. 219v–20) The Morgan Library & Museum Web site
Image of Vision of the Heavenly Jerusalem (fol. 222v) The Morgan Library & Museum Web site
The Art of medieval Spain, A.D. 500-1200, an exhibition catalog from The Metropolitan Museum of Art Libraries (fully available online as PDF), which contains material on Morgan Beatus (no. 78)

10th-century illuminated manuscripts
Illuminated beatus manuscripts
10th-century Christian texts
Mozarabic art and architecture
Collection of the Morgan Library & Museum
Spanish manuscripts